LS may refer to:

Businesses 
 LS Group, a Korean company
 Jet2.com (IATA code: LS), a British airline

Latin 
 Lewis and Short (abbr. "L&S"), authors of the 1879 work A Latin Dictionary
 Lectori Salutem (L.S.), Latin for 'Greetings Reader' and used as opening words to a letter
 locus sigilli, Latin for 'place of the seal', used in notarized and legal documents;  see:  Seal (contract law)

Organizations 
 Liberal Party of Croatia ( or LS), a Croatian political party active from 1998–2006
 Lincoln-Sudbury Regional High School, Massachusetts, US
 Lok Sabha, the lower house of the Parliament of India
 Loyola Schools, the college unit of the Ateneo de Manila University in Quezon City, Philippines

Places 
 Lesotho (ISO 3166-1 country code: LS), a country in southern Africa
 LS postcode area, UK, covering Leeds
 County Laois, Ireland

Science, technology, and mathematics

Astronomy 
 Light-second (ls), a unit of length in astronomy equivalent to the distance light travels in one second
 Local Supercluster (LS) or Virgo Superclaster, our galaxy supercluster

Biology and medicine 
 Lung surfactant, a lipoprotein complex
 Legius syndrome, also known as Neurofibromatosis 1-like syndrome, a genetic disorder
 Lichen sclerosus, a skin disease
 Linnean Society of London, postnominal LS
 Live sand, in aquaria, sand populated with bacteria and organisms to aid in dissolving organic wastes

Computing and electronics 
 ls, a command specified by POSIX and by the Single UNIX Specification; used for listing files
 .ls, the internet top-level domain for Lesotho
 Link-state routing protocol, used in packet-switching networks
 Location Services, a component of Microsoft's System Center Configuration Manager software
 LS, a low-power Schottky version of a 7400 series chip

Engineering 
 Land Surveyor

Mathematics 
 Least squares, a regression analysis
 Löwenheim–Skolem theorem, a theorem in first-order logic dealing with the cardinality of models

Physics 
 LS coupling, interaction between quantum numbers

Transportation 
 LS, a generic trim of Chevrolet vehicles
 LS, a model prefix on sailplanes made by Rolladen-Schneider Flugzeugbau GmbH
 LS 90, a Czech and Slovak train protection system
 Lexus LS, the flagship, full-size sedan made by Lexus
 Lincoln LS, a model of car made from 2000 to 2006
 GM LS engine, a V-8 engine in General Motors cars

Other uses 
 La Salle (disambiguation), several places and educational institutions
 Latvian lats (Ls or ℒ𝓈), former currency of Latvia
 LaVeyan Satanism, a religious group
 Leading Seaman, a junior non-commissioned rank in several navies
 Logistics Specialist, a rating in the United States Navy
 Long snapper, a special teams player in American football
 Lost Souls (online game), a MUD, or text-based online role-playing game
 Sudanese pound, currency of Sudan, abbreviated to LS or £Sd
 Syrian pound, currency of Syria, abbreviated to LS or £S